Chanda Aur Bijli (English: Moon and Lightning) is a 1969 Bollywood film directed by Atma Ram. It stars Sanjeev Kumar, Padmini in lead roles. The film was dedicated to actor-filmmaker Guru Dutt.
The story depicts the struggle of two lives, A beautiful street dancer Bijli (played by Padmini) is in a gang of thieves and Chanda (played by Sachin) is the heir to a posh household but due to the death of his parents lands up in an orphanage.

Plot
A beautiful street dancer Bijli is in a gang of petty thieves. Sachin is the heir to a heritage household but due to the death of his parents lands up in an orphanage. In the orphanage when the children are ill -treated by the manager, his royal blood automatically singles him out to take cudgels for the rest of the children. He dares to challenge the Orphanage manager and is severely beaten and reprimanded. Meanwhile, the servant woman (midwife) who had helped to deliver him, and who stole his mother's bangles and other proof of his royal lineage is on her death bed. She summons the orphanage manager and gives him the proof of Chanda's birth to atone for her sins before dying. But the orphanage manager plays mischief and along with the adopted son of the royal grandparents plans to eliminate Chanda. Chanda runs away and joins a petty thieves' gang by chance, but is unable to adapt himself to their ways. Soon during a robbery escapade in his own home he ends up in his original house. There, through many twists and turns of destiny he is able to contact his real grandparents, and also reform the gang of small time thieves.

Cast
 Sanjeev Kumar as Sheroo
 Padmini as Bijli
 Jeevan as Bhagatram	
 Bipin Gupta as Rajeshwarnath
 Pratima Devi as Mrs. Rajeshwarnath
 Bela Bose as Gauri
 Randhir as Dharamdas
 Ulhas as Ghanshyam
 Jankidas as Dindayal
 Mohan Choti as Kalidas
 Mehmood Jr. as Tingu
 Keshto Mukherjee as Raju
 Sachin as Chanda

Soundtrack
The film's music was composed by Shankar–Jaikishan.

Awards and nominations
Neeraj was nominated for Filmfare Award for Best Lyricist in 1969 for "Ram Krishna Hari"

References

External links
 

1969 films
Films scored by Shankar–Jaikishan
1960s Hindi-language films